Trichiana is a comune (municipality) in the Province of Belluno in the Italian region Veneto, located about  north of Venice and about  southwest of Belluno.

Twin towns
Trichiana is twinned with:

  Saubens, France

References

External links
 trichiana.valbelluna.bl.it/Home/Default.asp

Cities and towns in Veneto